Gisvi Isaque Andrade Antunes (born 6 March 1982 in Windhoek, South-West Africa), known simply as Gisvi, is a Portuguese former footballer who played as a forward.

Honours
Sporting
Taça de Portugal: 2001–02

References

External links

1982 births
Living people
Portuguese sportspeople of Angolan descent
Footballers from Windhoek
Black Portuguese sportspeople
Portuguese men's footballers
Association football forwards
Liga Portugal 2 players
Segunda Divisão players
Sporting CP B players
Sporting CP footballers
A.D. Lousada players
C.D. Fátima players
A.D. Ovarense players
F.C. Lixa players
Clube Olímpico do Montijo players
Football League (Greece) players
Ethnikos Asteras F.C. players
Divisiones Regionales de Fútbol players
Zamora CF footballers
Portugal youth international footballers
Portuguese expatriate footballers
Expatriate footballers in Greece
Expatriate footballers in Spain
Portuguese expatriate sportspeople in Greece
Portuguese expatriate sportspeople in Spain
Namibian men's footballers